Dune is a science fiction media franchise that originated with the 1965 novel Dune by American author Frank Herbert. Dune is frequently cited as the best-selling science fiction novel in history, and won the 1966 Hugo Award as well as the inaugural Nebula Award for Best Novel. Herbert wrote five sequels before his death in 1986. Dune was adapted into film in 1984 and again in 2021, and a 2000 television miniseries. The first two sequels were adapted as a miniseries in 2003. 
Since 1999, Herbert's son Brian Herbert and science fiction author Kevin J. Anderson have published 13 prequel novels, as well as two which complete the original Dune series.

Novels by Frank Herbert
Frank Herbert's Dune was published in 1965, and he wrote five sequels before his death in 1986: Dune Messiah (1969), Children of Dune (1976), God Emperor of Dune (1981), Heretics of Dune (1984), and Chapterhouse: Dune (1985). Dune follows Paul, the scion of House Atreides, as his family is thrown into the dangerous political intrigues centered on the desert planet Arrakis, only known source of the oracular spice melange, the most important and valuable substance in the universe. The series spans 5,000 years, focusing on Paul's various descendants.

Introduced in Dune (1965)

House Atreides 
 Duke Leto I Atreides, head of House Atreides
 Lady Jessica, Bene Gesserit and concubine of Leto, and mother of Paul and Alia
 Paul Atreides, son of Leto and Jessica
 Alia Atreides, daughter of Leto and Jessica
 Gurney Halleck, troubadour warrior of House Atreides
 Thufir Hawat, Mentat and Master of Assassins of House Atreides
 Duncan Idaho, swordmaster of House Atreides
 Dr. Wellington Yueh, Suk doctor of House Atreides
 Leto, first son of Paul and Chani who dies as a toddler
 Esmar Tuek, a smuggler on Arrakis
 Staban Tuek, son of Esmar

House Corrino 
 Shaddam IV, 81st Padishah Emperor of the Known Universe, head of House Corrino
 Count Hasimir Fenring, Imperial Spice Minister and Shaddam's closest friend and advisor
 Princess Irulan, eldest daughter of Shaddam IV and Anirul
 Aramsham, Sardaukar captain

House Harkonnen 
 Baron Vladimir Harkonnen, head of House Harkonnen
 Feyd-Rautha, nephew and heir of the Baron
 Glossu "Beast" Rabban, older nephew of the Baron
 Piter De Vries, twisted Mentat of House Harkonnen
 Iakin Nefud, guard captain of House Harkonnen

Bene Gesserit 
 Reverend Mother Gaius Helen Mohiam, the Emperor's Truthsayer and Jessica's former teacher
 Margot, Lady Fenring, wife of Count Fenring
 Wanna, wife of Dr. Wellington Yueh (mentioned in Dune)

Fremen 
 Chani, daughter of Liet-Kynes and Faroula, and Paul's Fremen concubine
 Stilgar, Fremen naib, friend to Liet-Kynes
 Liet-Kynes, the Imperial Planetologist on Arrakis
 Shadout Mapes, housekeeper for House Atreides on Arrakis
 Reverend Mother Ramallo, Fremen Reverend Mother
 Harah, wife of Jamis, Paul's servant and later wife of Stilgar
 Jamis, killed by Paul in ritual combat
 Korba, Fedaykin commando and later a leader in Paul's Quizarate
 Otheym, Fedaykin commando

Introduced in Dune Messiah (1969)
 Edric, Spacing Guild Navigator and the Guild's ambassador on Arrakis
 Scytale, Tleilaxu Face Dancer conspiring against Paul
 Bijaz, Tleilaxu dwarf in Scytale's employ
 Leto II Atreides, Paul and Chani's son and twin brother of Ghanima
 Ghanima Atreides, Paul and Chani's daughter and twin sister of Leto II
 Lichna, Otheym's daughter

Introduced in Children of Dune (1976)
 Farad'n, son of Princess Wensicia and grandson of Shaddam IV
 Princess Wensicia, third daughter of Shaddam IV and Anirul

Introduced in God Emperor of Dune (1981)
 Tertius Eileen Anteac, a Bene Gesserit
 Moneo Atreides, majordomo and result of the God Emperor's breeding program and father of Siona
 Siona Atreides, daughter of Moneo
 Quintinius Violet Chenoeh, a Bene Gesserit
 Marcus Claire Luyseyal, a Bene Gesserit
 Malky, confidante of Leto II
 Nayla, a Fish Speaker in the service of the God Emperor
 Hwi Noree, betrothed and Ixian ambassador to Leto II
 Syaksa, a Bene Gesserit

Introduced in Heretics of Dune (1984)
 Bellonda, a Bene Gesserit
 Lucilla, a Bene Gesserit
 Murbella, an Honored Matre who becomes a Bene Gesserit Reverend Mother and assumes control of both orders
 Darwi Odrade, a Bene Gesserit
 Schwangyu, a Bene Gesserit
 Sheeana, a native of Arrakis who possesses the power to control sandworms
 Tamalane, a Bene Gesserit
 Alma Mavis Taraza, Mother Superior of the Bene Gesserit
 Miles Teg, former Supreme Bashar of the Bene Gesserit
 Tylwyth Waff, Tleilaxu Master

Introduced in Chapterhouse: Dune (1985)
 Dama, leader of the Honored Matres
 Logno, Dama's murderer and successor

Novels by Brian Herbert and Kevin J. Anderson

Since 1999, Herbert's son Brian Herbert and author Kevin J. Anderson have published 14 prequel novels, collected in the series Prelude to Dune (1999–2001), Legends of Dune (2002–2004), Heroes of Dune (2008–2009), Great Schools of Dune (2012–2016), and The Caladan Trilogy (2020–2022). They have also released two novels—Hunters of Dune (2006) and Sandworms of Dune (2007)—which complete the original series.

Introduced in Prelude to Dune (1999–2001)
 Hidar Fen Ajidica, Tleilaxu Master
 Anirul, Bene Gesserit wife of Shaddam IV (mentioned in Dune)
 Helena Atreides, mother of Leto I
 Duke Paulus Atreides, father of Leto I
 Victor Atreides, son of Leto and Kailea Vernius of  Ix
 Elrood IX Corrino, 80th Padishah Emperor of the Known Universe and father of Shaddam IV
 Faroula, wife of Liet-Kynes and Chani's mother (mentioned in God Emperor of Dune)
 Harishka, Mother Superior of the Bene Gesserit
 Abulurd Harkonnen II, half-brother of the Baron; father of Glossu and Feyd (mentioned in Dune)
 Dmitri Harkonnen, father of Vladimir and Abulurd II
 Pardot Kynes, first Imperial Planetologist on Arrakis and father of Liet-Kynes
 C'tair Pilru, twin brother of D'murr
 Cammar Pilru, ambassador of Ix and father of C'tair and D'murr
 D'murr Pilru, Guild Navigator, twin brother of C'tair
 Edwina Richese, daughter of Elrood IX
 Earl Dominic Vernius, head of House Vernius
 Kailea Vernius, daughter of Dominic and Shando, and Rhombur's sister
 Tyros Reffa, illegitimate son of Elrood IX
 Rhombur Vernius, eldest son of Dominic and Shando, later the cyborg ruler of Ix
 Shando Balut-Vernius, wife of Dominic
 Tessia, Bene Gesserit wife of Rhombur

Introduced in Legends of Dune (2002–2004)
 Estes Atreides, son of Vorian, twin of Kagin
 Kagin Atreides, son of Vorian, twin of Estes
 Vorian Atreides, the founder of the house and son of the Titan Agamemnon
 Lord Niko Bludd
 Abulurd Butler, brother of Faykan, later becomes Abulurd Harkonnen
 Faykan Butler, founder of House Corrino, later becomes Faykan Corrino
 Livia Butler, wife of Manion Sr. and mother of Serena, abbess of the City of Interspection
 Manion Butler, "Manion the Innocent", martyred infant of Serena
 Manion Butler Sr., father of Serena
 Octa Butler, Serena's sister and wife of Xavier Harkonnen
 Quentin Butler, husband of Wandra
 Rayna Butler, founder of the Cult of Serena
 Rikov Butler, governor of Parmentier and primero of the Jihad, father of Rayna
 Serena Butler, Priestess of the Jihad
 Wandra Butler, daughter of Xavier Harkonnen
 Norma Cenva, inventor of foldspace technology and the first Guild Navigator (mentioned in God Emperor of Dune)
 Ticia Cenva, sister of Norma, daughter of Iblis Ginjo
 Zufa Cenva, mother of Norma
 Faykan Corrino, founder of the Padishah Empire
 Iblis Ginjo, human trustee and later Grand Patriarch of the Holy Jihad
 Abulurd Harkonnen, grandson of Xavier
 Xavier Harkonnen, military leader during the Butlerian Jihad
 Tio Holtzman
 Jool Noret, legendary Ginaz mercenary
 Yorek Thurr, head of the Jipol
 Aurelius Venport, founder of VenKee enterprises, the ancestor of the Guild
 Adrien Venport, son of Aurelius Venport and Norma Cenva
 Warrick, best friend of Liet-Kynes, killed in the spice agony
 El'him Wormrider, son of Selim
 Selim Wormrider, leader of Zensunni outlaws on Arrakis and the first wormrider

Titans, Neo-Cymeks and thinking machines 
 Agamemnon, a human brain within a fearsome machine body, leader of the Titans
 Ajax, a Titan
 Gilbertus Albans, adopted human son of Erasmus, founder of the Order of Mentats
 Barbarossa, a Titan
 Beowulf a Neo-Cymek, a new generation of human-machine hybrids created by the Titans
 Chirox, reprogrammed robot used as a battle trainer on Ginaz
 Dante, a Titan
 Erasmus, an independent robot who serves Omnius
 Hecate, a Titan
 Juno, a Titan
 Omnius, the Evermind, leader of the thinking machines
 Seurat, co-pilot to Vorian Atreides
 Tamerlane, a Titan
 Tlaloc, a Titan
 Xerxes, a Titan

Introduced in Hunters of Dune (2006)
 Elder Burah of the Lost Tleilaxu
 Edrik, a Guild Navigator
 Hellica, leader of the Honored Matres
 Khrone, enhanced Face Dancer
 Viscount Hundro Moritani
 Count Ilban Richese, head of House Richese
 Uxtal of the Lost Tleilaxu

References

 
Dune